Heywood's Guide was a series of travel guide books to England, Scotland, and Wales, published in the 1860s-1910s by Abel Heywood of Manchester.

List of Heywood Guides by geographic coverage

England

Wales

List of Heywood Guides A-Z

 Aberystwith
 Alderley Edge
 Alton Towers, Dove Dale &c.
 Bakewell and the Dales of the Wye
 Bala, North Wales
 Bangor and Beaumaris
 Barmouth and Harlech
 Bath
 Beddgelert
 Belle Vue Gardens, Manchester
 Birkenhead, New Brighton, &c.
 Birmingham
 Blackpool and Fleetwood
 Bournemouth
 Bridlington Quay
 Brighton
 Bristol and Clifton
 Buxton and Neighbourhood
 Carnarvon and Llanberis
 Castleton, Derbyshire
 Chatsworth and Haddon Hall
 Chester
 Coniston and Furness Abbey
 Dolgelly
 Douglas
 Dover
 Eastbourne
 Edinburgh
 Folkestone
 Grimsby and Cleethorpes
 Guernsey
 Harrogate and Neighljourhood
 Hastings
 Hayfield, Kinder Scout, and the Peak
 Ilkley, Bolton Abbey, &c.
 Ingleton
 Isle of Man
 Isle of Wight
 Jersey
 Kenilworth
 Keswick and Derwentwater
 Knaresborough
 Leamington
 Liverpool
 Llandudno
 Llangollen and Corwen
 Lliuirwst and Bettws-y-Coed
 Loch Lomond, Loch Katrine, and the Trossachs
 London
 Lytham and St. Anne's-on-the-Sea
 Malvern
 Manchester
 Margate
 Marple, Romiley, &c.
 Matlock Bath and Matlock Bank
 Morecambe and Neighbourhood
 Oxford
 Penmaenmawr and Conway
 Portsmouth
 Ramsey, Isle of Man
 Ramsgate
 Reading
 Redcar and Saltburn-by-the-Sea
 Rhyl, St. Asaph, Abergele, &c.
 Scarborough and Neighbourhood
 Snowdon and the Glyders
 Southampton
 Southend, Essex
 Southport
 Stratford-on-Avon
 Torquay
 Ulverston and Morceambe
 Warwick
 Weston-super-Mare
 Weymouth
 Whalley Abbey
 Whitby
 Windermere and Grasmere
 Worksop and Sherwood Forest
 York, its Antiquities, &c.

References

Travel guide books
Series of books
Publications established in the 1860s
Books about the United Kingdom
Tourism in the United Kingdom